Manuel Duhnke (born 10 August 1987) is a German former professional footballer who played as a midfielder.

Career
Duhnke began his career with TSV 1860 Munich, and made one 2. Bundesliga appearance for the club, as a substitute for Daniel Bierofka in a 5–0 win over Erzgebirge Aue in December 2007. He made 56 appearances for 1860's reserve team, often as captain, and scored for the first-team in a friendly match against Bayern Munich in January 2008 which ended 1–1. Six months later, Duhnke joined Bayern, to play for reserve team in the 3. Liga. He made his debut for the club on the opening day of the 2008–09 season, as a substitute for Thomas Müller in a 2–1 win over 1. FC Union Berlin. He made 33 appearances for Bayern II over the next two seasons, leaving after the team were relegated at the end of the 2009–10 season. He spent half a season without a club, signing for Austrian side USK Anif in January 2011. Eighteen months later he returned to Germany to sign for Würzburger Kickers of the Regionalliga Bayern.

Personal life
Duhnke's younger brother Marius is also a footballer.

References

External links
 

1987 births
Living people
Sportspeople from Würzburg
German footballers
Footballers from Bavaria
Association football midfielders
2. Bundesliga players
3. Liga players
FC Bayern Munich II players
TSV 1860 Munich II players
TSV 1860 Munich players
Würzburger Kickers players
SV Heimstetten players
USK Anif players
German expatriate footballers
German expatriate sportspeople in Austria
Expatriate footballers in Austria